Sungei Kadut MRT station is a future Mass Rapid Transit interchange station on the North South (NSL) and Downtown (DTL) lines, located in Sungei Kadut, Singapore. First announced as a provisional station on the NSL Woodlands Extension in the 1990s, plans for its construction was eventually confirmed in the Land Transport Master Plan (LTMP) 2040 by the Land Transport Authority (LTA).

History
When the Woodlands Extension was announced in the 1990s, Sungei Kadut (then named Kadut under station code N19) was one of the stations part of the extension, but was made as a provisional station. The station was to be built only when the Sungei Kadut Industrial Estate was being redeveloped which caused Kranji station to be confirmed under station code N18 (now NS7).

Sungei Kadut station was eventually announced on 25 May 2019 as an interchange station for the Downtown Line (DTL) and North South Line (NSL), as part of the LTMP 2040 by the LTA. The DTL is planned to extend from its current terminus at Bukit Panjang station to connect to the NSL at this station. The station will be an infill station built between Kranji and Yew Tee stations, serving upcoming industrial developments in the area by JTC Corporation and the  Agri-Food Innovation Park.

References

Proposed railway stations in Singapore
Mass Rapid Transit (Singapore) stations